Jeřmanice is a municipality and village in Liberec District in the Liberec Region of the Czech Republic. It has about 600 inhabitants.

History
The first written mention of Jeřmanice is from 1543.

Transport
Jeřmanice lies on the railway line from Pardubice to Liberec. The D35 motorway runs through the municipality.

References

External links

Villages in Liberec District